The European Superstock 1000 Championship, formerly FIM Superstock 1000 Cup or Superstock 1000 FIM Cup, was a supporting class to the Superbike World Championship.

Overview
The series was introduced in 1999 as a European championship and in October 2004 became the Superstock 1000 FIM Cup. It was classified as a FIM Prize. For 2017, the FIM CEV European Superbike Championship was discontinued and the FIM Cup was renamed European Superstock 1000 Championship, with its status changed back to European championship. The series was closed at the end of the 2018 season.

The championship was organized and promoted as its parent series by FGSport (renamed Infront Motor Sports in 2008) until 2012, and by Dorna since 2013 season to its closure.

Regulations

Technical regulations
Much the same as the Superbike World Championship but all the bikes were much closer stock to spec and there was an age restriction on riders. FIM Superstock 1000 motorcycles were allowed modifications more aimed at safety and crash survivability/repairability than outright performance such as fiberglass silhouette bodywork with fluid retention capabilities and improved hand and foot controls. FIM Superstock 1000 motorcycles were allowed performance modifications such as brake pads and discs, chaindrive systems, exhaust systems, fork internals and rear shock absorbers.

Sporting regulations
At his inception, the series was restricted to riders aged from 16 to 24; the upper limit was raised to 26 in 2011, and to 28 in 2015.

The points system was the same for the riders' championship and the manufacturers' championship, but only the highest-finishing motorcycle by a particular manufacturer was awarded the points for the latter championship.

Champions

See also
Superbike World Championship
Supersport World Championship
Supersport 300 World Championship
European Superstock 600 Championship
Grand Prix motorcycle racing
Isle of Man TT

References

External links

 
Motorcycle road racing series